Platypodia alcocki is a species of crab.

References

Crustaceans described in 1941
Xanthoidea